The 1995–96 Bayern Munich season was their 95th season of existence and 31st Bundesliga season.

Review and events
Bayern Munich appointed Werder Bremen manager Otto Rehhagel to try to improve on the club's  disappointing sixth-place finish the previous season. Several players, including Jürgen Klinsmann and Andreas Herzog, were purchased and it was widely expected that Munich would steamroll the opposition; but from the very start Rehhagel clashed with the team and the team environment, his single-minded and eccentric ways, incompatible with those at Bayern. Moreover, Rehhagel's old-fashioned tactics and patronising of the players caused major antipathy in the Bayern team, especially from Klinsmann, who never missed an opportunity to criticise Rehhagel. The team disintegrated in the second half of the season. Rehhagel ousted three weeks before they were to play in the UEFA Cup final, after a disappointing end to their league campaign. He was replaced by Franz Beckenbauer, who led the team to victory in the UEFA Cup.

Match results

Legend

Friendlies

Fuji-Cup

Cartagineses y Romanos Trophy

Bundesliga

Results by round

League results

League standings

DFB-Pokal

UEFA Cup

First round

Second round

Third round

Quarterfinals

Semifinals

Final

Player information

Transfers

In

Out

Roster & statistics

Bookings

Suspensions

Minutes played

References

Match reports

Other sources

FC Bayern Munich seasons
Bayern Munich
UEFA Europa League-winning seasons